Helene Olafsen (born 21 February 1990) is a Norwegian snowboarder.

She placed tenth overall in the 2007-08 Snowboarding World Cup, and fifth in her special event boardercross, where she collected 3570 of her total 4160 points. She took her first victory in a World Cup event in March 2007, and finished fifth at the 2007 Winter X Games.

In 2021, she participated on the Norwegian TV series Norges nye megahit, on which various celebrities competed to create a hit song. Olafsen sang "Ludvig Daae", named after a real man who owned a slalom centre and had "strong opinions about behavior on the slalom slope". The song reached number one in Norway in December 2021.

2010 Olympics
Olafsen progressed all the way to the big final of Snowboard Cross at the 2010 Winter Olympics in Vancouver, she finished fourth. Canada's Maëlle Ricker went on to win the gold medal for the host country.

References

External links
 X Games bio
 
 
 

1990 births
Living people
Norwegian female snowboarders
People from Oppegård
Snowboarders at the 2010 Winter Olympics
Snowboarders at the 2014 Winter Olympics
Olympic snowboarders of Norway
X Games athletes
Sportspeople from Viken (county)
21st-century Norwegian women